Billiards and snooker at the 2015 Southeast Asian Games was held in OCBC Arena Hall 4, in Kallang, Singapore from 6 to 10 June 2015. Ten competitions was held in men's snooker singles, snooker doubles, English billiards singles, English billiards singles (500 points), English billiards doubles, English billiards team, 9-ball pool doubles and in men's 1 cushion carom and in men, women's 9-ball pool singles.

Participating nations
A total of 82 athletes from nine nations competed in billiards and snooker at the 2015 Southeast Asian Games:

Medalists

Snooker

English billiards

9-ball pool

1 cushion carom

Results

Men

Snooker singles

Snooker doubles

English billiards singles

English billiards singles (500)

English billiards doubles

English billiard team

9-ball pool men's singles

9-ball pool women's singles

9-ball pool men's doubles

1 cushion carom

Medal table

References

External links
 

Cue sports at the Southeast Asian Games
2015 Southeast Asian Games events
2015 in cue sports
2015 in snooker
Cue sports in Singapore
Kallang